Maximus IV, previously known as Manasses, was an Orthodox Christian monk and bishop. He was Ecumenical Patriarch of Constantinople from 1491 to 1497.

Life
He was abbot of the Vatopedi monastery on Mount Athos before being appointed by Patriarch Symeon I of Constantinople as Metropolitan bishop of Serres, which he governed under the religious name of Manasses.

In the first months of 1491, he was elected Patriarch of Constantinople with the support of the monks of Mount Athos. On his election, he changed his name to Maximus, an unparalleled case in the history of the Ecumenical Patriarchate because usually a monastic name is maintained throughout an ecclesiastic career. As Patriarch, he defended the rights of Orthodox Christians living in territories under the Venetian Republic.

During his reign arose some pieces of gossip about him, not specified by the sources, which led to his deposition in early 1497.

After his resignation, he remained actively involved with ecclesiastic issues, even plotting against his successor Nephon II, until he was forced to retire in the Vatopedi monastery, where he died at an unknown date.

Notes

External links
 Historia politica et patriarchica Constantinopoleos, Cap XII: P. Maximus, (trans. Martin Crusius, 1584) Primary source. 

15th-century people from the Ottoman Empire
15th-century patriarchs of Constantinople
15th-century Greek people
Athonite Fathers
People associated with Vatopedi